Langfitt Run is a stream in the U.S. state of West Virginia.

Langfitt Run has the name of Ebenezer Langfitt, a local pioneer.

Course
Langfitt Run rises about 1.5 miles east of New Manchester, West Virginia, in Hancock County and then flows southeast to join Hardin Run at about 3 miles southeast of New Manchester.

Watershed
Langfitt Run drains  of area, receives about 38.0 in/year of precipitation, has a wetness index of 309.75, and is about 51% forested.

See also
List of rivers of West Virginia

References

Rivers of Hancock County, West Virginia
Rivers of West Virginia